is a railway station located in Nakamachi (仲町), Kenbuchi-chō, Kamikawa-gun, Hokkaidō. It is operated by the Hokkaido Railway Company.

Lines served
JR Hokkaidō
Soya Main Line

Adjacent stations

External links
Ekikara Time Table - JR Kenbuchi Station (Japanese) 

Railway stations in Hokkaido Prefecture
Railway stations in Japan opened in 1900